The 2021 Memphis 901 FC season is the third season for Memphis 901 FC in the USL Championship, the second-tier professional soccer league in the United States and Canada. This article covers the period from November 2, 2020 (the day after the ultimately cancelled 2020 USL-C playoffs final) to the end of the 2021 USL-C season (tentatively scheduled for November, 2021).

Club

Current roster

Competitions

USL Championship

Central Division Standings

Match results

The 2021 USL Championship season schedule for the club was announced on December 19, 2018.

Unless otherwise noted, all times in Central time

U.S. Open Cup

On March 29, 2021, the U.S. Soccer Federation announced a truncated format for the 2021 U.S. Open Cup, with 16 clubs participating, entering at the same time in a Round of 16. The format included just four teams from the USL Championship, the four semi-finalists from the 2020 playoffs (El Paso, Louisville, Phoenix, and Tampa). Due to the fact that Memphis failed to qualify for the 2020 USL-C playoffs, this eliminated the club from the 2021 U.S. Open Cup.

References

Memphis 901 FC
Memphis 901
Memphis
Memphis 901